Château Beauséjour was a historic estate in Saint-Émilion in the Bordeaux region of France that until 1869  formed a single property, since divided into two neighbouring wineries. A name also used elsewhere, to date Château Beauséjour may refer to:

 Château Beau-Séjour Bécot, formerly Château Beauséjour-Dr-Fagouet
 Château Beauséjour (Duffau-Lagarrosse), formerly Château Beauséjour-Duffau-Lagarrosse
 Château Beauséjour (Montagne Saint-Émilion)